Brendan Hamill may refer to:

 Brendan Hamill (writer) (born 1945), Northern Ireland poet and writer
 Brendan Hamill (soccer) (born 1992), Australian football (soccer) player